Coming Home is a Canadian documentary film, directed by Bill Reid and released in 1973. Made for the National Film Board of Canada, the film documents Reid's own trip home to visit his parents in Sarnia, Ontario, and the family's conversations about the communication difficulties and generational differences in values that have complicated their familial relationship.

The film won the Canadian Film Award for Best Theatrical Documentary at the 25th Canadian Film Awards.

References

External links
 

1973 films
1973 documentary films
Canadian documentary films
National Film Board of Canada documentaries
Best Documentary Film Genie and Canadian Screen Award winners
1970s English-language films
1970s Canadian films